Enchocrates habroschema is a moth in the family Depressariidae. It was described by Alfred Jefferis Turner in 1946. It is found in Australia, where it has been recorded from South Australia.

References

Moths described in 1946
Enchocrates